Harry Edward Kane  (born 28 July 1993) is an English professional footballer who plays as a striker for  club Tottenham Hotspur and captains the England national team. A prolific goalscorer with strong link play, Kane is regarded as one of the best strikers in the world. He is Tottenham's all-time top goalscorer and England's joint-highest all-time top goalscorer. He is also the third-highest Premier League all-time top goalscorer.

Born and raised in the London borough of Waltham Forest, Kane began his career at Tottenham Hotspur, where, after fast progression through the team's youth academy, he was promoted to the senior team in 2009, at age 16. He was loaned out to clubs across the English football pyramid, including Leyton Orient, Millwall, Leicester City, and Norwich City. Kane's involvement at Tottenham increased after Mauricio Pochettino became head coach in 2014. In his first full season at the club, Kane scored 31 goals across all competitions, was the Premier League's second-highest goalscorer, and was named PFA Young Player of the Year.

In the 2015–16 and 2016–17 seasons, Kane finished as the league's top goalscorer. In the latter campaign, he helped Tottenham finish as the competition's runners-up and was named PFA Fans' Player of the Year. Kane registered his best campaign statistically to date in the 2017–18 season, with 41 goals scored in 48 games across all competitions, and in the following season, he finished as a runner-up in the UEFA Champions League. He ended the 2020–21 season as the league's top goalscorer and top assist provider.

Kane has scored 53 goals in 80 appearances for England. He appeared and scored at every youth level and made a goalscoring debut with the senior team in March 2015, at age 21. Kane featured and scored during England's successful UEFA Euro 2016 qualifying campaign, and represented the country at the tournament. He was named England captain just before the 2018 FIFA World Cup, where he finished as competition top goalscorer, winning the Golden Boot, leading England to fourth place, their highest finish since 1990. He led England to the runner-up position at UEFA Euro 2020, marking their first appearance in a final at the tournament and their first major final since 1966.

Early life
Harry Edward Kane was born on 28 July 1993 in Walthamstow, London to Kim (née Hogg) and Patrick Kane and has one older brother, Charlie. He has Irish ancestry through his father, who is from Galway. The family moved to Chingford where Kane attended Larkswood Primary Academy until 2004, followed by Chingford Foundation School (also attended by David Beckham). He played football from a young age, joining a local club, Ridgeway Rovers, when he was six in 1999. Kane talked about footballing in the family:

Kane also said: "Most of my family were Spurs fans and I grew up 15 minutes from the ground, so I was always going to be a Spurs fan". He named former Spurs striker Teddy Sheringham his childhood idol, and saw him as a "great finisher" and a role model in his ability to get in the box and score goals. Other childhood sporting influences he cited include David Beckham and Jermain Defoe. Kane has also spoken of his admiration for the former Brazil forward Ronaldo, adding that he loved to watch footage of him on YouTube: "He was one of the first ones I looked at and thought, 'Wow. He's a goalscorer, I want to be a goalscorer.'"

Club career

Tottenham Hotspur

2004–10: Youth career
Kane first played for a local club, Ridgeway Rovers, and joined the Arsenal youth academy when he was eight years old. He was released after one season for being "a bit chubby" and not "very athletic", according to Liam Brady who was then in charge of Arsenal's academy. Manager Arsène Wenger stated in November 2015 that he was disappointed that Arsenal chose to release Kane. He also had a trial at Tottenham Hotspur but was not initially successful, and he returned to his old club Ridgeway Rovers. In 2004, at the age of eleven, he joined Watford academy for a four to six-week trial, and was then given another chance at Tottenham after he impressed playing for Watford against Tottenham. He first played at Tottenham as a midfielder – initially in a holding position, then as an attacking midfielder.

In his early days at Tottenham, Kane did not stand out as a player as he was neither big nor was he particularly quick, but those who worked with him noted his constant desire to improve various aspects of his game. A couple of years after joining, he had a large growth spurt that made him taller and physically stronger. In the 2008–09 season, he played in the under-16s side that competed in the Copa Chivas tournament in Mexico, and the Bellinzona tournament in Switzerland, scoring three goals. In July 2009, on his 16th birthday, he signed a scholarship contract with Tottenham.

In the 2009–10 season, Kane played 22 times for Tottenham's under-18s, scoring 18 goals. Kane appeared on the first-team bench twice during the 2009–10 season. Both matches were in home domestic cup victories: one the League Cup fixture against Everton on 27 October 2009 and the other in the FA Cup fourth-round replay against Bolton Wanderers on 24 February 2010.

2010–14: Loan spells across England
He signed his first professional contract with the club in July 2010. On 7 January 2011, Kane moved to Leyton Orient on loan until the end of the 2010–11 season. Manager Russell Slade was "happy" at his arrival and said, "I'm sure he will have an impact with us over the coming months". He made his first-team debut for Orient on 15 January, coming on as a substitute for Scott McGleish in the 73rd minute of a 1–1 draw away to Rochdale. A week later, Kane scored his first first-team goal against Sheffield Wednesday; making his first-ever start, "unmarked" Kane scored from a Dean Cox free kick in the 57th minute as Orient eventually won 4–0. Slade said that he was "delighted" that Kane scored a goal on his first league start. On 12 February, he scored twice in a 4–1 win over Bristol Rovers, after coming on as a substitute for McGleish in the 70th minute. He ended the season scoring five goals in 18 matches.

On 25 August 2011, Kane made his first appearance for Tottenham, starting in the second leg of their UEFA Europa League qualification round against Hearts, with Tottenham making changes after winning the first leg 5–0. His debut was a goalless match, although he won a penalty after being fouled by goalkeeper Jamie MacDonald, who then saved the penalty which Kane took himself. He went on to make six appearances in the Europa League that season, scoring his first Tottenham goal in the 4–0 win away to Shamrock Rovers on 15 December 2011.

On 29 December 2011, Kane and Tottenham teammate Ryan Mason agreed to join Championship club Millwall on loan from 1 January 2012 until the end of the season. After making his debut against Bristol City, manager Kenny Jackett said that he had "very good debut" but was "unlucky not to score". He also said that Kane would "be a good addition" for the club in the second half of the season. He went on to score seven goals in the final 14 matches of the season. Kane scored nine goals in 27 matches which resulted in him being named Millwall's Young Player of the Year for 2011–12. His run of goals scored towards the end of the season has been credited with helping to raise Millwall in the table away from the threat of relegation that season.

Kane spent pre-season 2012–13 season with Tottenham, scoring a hat-trick in a 6–0 away win against Southend United on 10 August 2012. On 18 August, he made his Premier League debut, against Newcastle United. Coming as an 86th-minute substitute for Sandro, Tottenham lost 2–1.

On 31 August 2012, Kane joined Premier League team Norwich City on a season-long loan, making his debut as a substitute against West Ham United. Kane suffered an injury, breaking a metatarsal bone, in the League Cup tie against Doncaster Rovers in only his second appearance. The 19-year-old underwent his rehabilitation at Tottenham but returned to action for Norwich on 29 December 2012, coming off the bench at half time as Norwich lost 3–4 to Manchester City. However, with Tottenham having been unable to add to their attacking options during the January transfer window, they opted to recall Kane on 1 February 2013, four months before he was due to return.

Twenty days after he was recalled to Tottenham, Kane joined Leicester City for the remainder of the season to aid in the club's push for automatic promotion from the Championship. He marked his home debut with a goal against Blackburn Rovers, in a 3–0 win on 26 February 2013. He made 13 appearances for the East Midlands club, eight from the bench, and they reached the play-off semi-final before being eliminated by Watford.

Kane scored his first Tottenham goal of the 2013–14 season at White Hart Lane in a League Cup tie against Hull City, scoring the equaliser in extra time, the match finished 2–2. Tottenham won 8–7 on penalties, with Kane taking and converting the fifth of the nine sets of spot-kicks.

On 7 April 2014, Kane was given his first Premier League start for Tottenham by manager Tim Sherwood, in a 5–1 win against Sunderland, and scored his first Premier League goal in the 59th minute. He also scored in the following match, helping Tottenham to recover from a 3–0 deficit against West Bromwich Albion before eventually drawing 3–3. He scored for the third match in a row on 19 April, this time helping Tottenham to a 3–1 London derby win at home over Fulham.

2014–15: PFA Young Player of the Year

Kane made his first appearance of the 2014–15 season as a substitute against West Ham on the opening day of the Premier League season, providing an assist for the match-winning goal by Eric Dier. He scored in both matches against Cypriot opposition AEL Limassol in Tottenham's UEFA Europa League play-offs, scoring an 80th-minute winner in the first leg, and opening the scoring in the 3–0 second leg victory after missing a penalty. He scored a late goal against Nottingham Forest in the League Cup to secure a 3–1 victory for Tottenham on 24 September 2014. On 23 October 2014, Kane scored his first professional hat-trick for Tottenham in a 5–1 win over Asteras Tripoli in the group stage of the UEFA Europa League. Kane was forced to play in goal for the final three minutes, after Hugo Lloris had been sent off with no substitutions remaining, and conceded a goal when he dropped a free-kick from Jerónimo Barrales.

On 2 November 2014, Kane came on as a second-half substitute in Tottenham's 2–1 win over Aston Villa and scored his first Premier League goal of the season to win the match in the 90th minute. Manager Mauricio Pochettino, who was appointed to replace Sherwood and had a rocky start at the club, has since said that this goal saved him from the sack. Kane then became a regular in Spurs' starting line-up under Pochettino; he was selected to start for the first time a week later for this Premier League season, and although the team lost 2–1 at home to Stoke City, he retained his place in the first XI for Spurs' 2–1 win away to Hull City on 23 November, scoring the team's equalising goal. Between 14 and 26 December, Kane scored in three consecutive 2–1 wins for Tottenham, against Swansea City, Burnley and Leicester City respectively. On 1 January 2015, Kane scored twice and won a penalty as Tottenham defeated rivals and league leaders Chelsea 5–3, and he scored a further two in a 3–0 away win against West Bromwich Albion on 31 January, including one from a penalty. Kane set up Christian Eriksen's late equaliser against Sheffield United on 28 January 2015, a goal which put Tottenham into the 2015 League Cup Final. His performances led to him being named as the Premier League Player of the Month for January 2015.

On 2 February 2015, Kane signed a new five-and-a-half-year contract with the club. Five days later, he scored both of Tottenham's goals as they came from behind to defeat Arsenal in the North London derby, his 21st and 22nd goals of the season across all competitions. After scoring against Arsenal, Liverpool and West Ham United, Kane was again named as the Premier League Player of the Month for February 2015, becoming only the fourth player to win the award in consecutive months. Tottenham lost the League Cup Final 2–0 to rivals Chelsea on 1 March 2015, which Kane described as the "worst feeling in the world". Twenty days later, he scored his first Premier League hat-trick in a 4–3 home win over his former loan club Leicester; this brought him to 19 league goals in the season, making him the division's top scorer.

On 5 April, Kane captained Tottenham for the first time in a 0–0 draw with Burnley at Turf Moor. Two weeks later, he scored his 30th goal of the season in a 3–1 win against Newcastle United at St James' Park, making him the first Tottenham player to reach that milestone since Gary Lineker in 1991–92. Later that month, he was included as one of two forwards in the PFA Team of the Year, alongside Chelsea's Diego Costa. He was also voted the PFA Young Player of the Year. On 24 May 2015, he headed in an Eric Dier cross for the only goal of an away win over Everton on the final day of the season to confirm fifth place for Tottenham, thus qualifying them to the group stage of the following season's UEFA Europa League. It was his 21st goal of the league campaign, equalling a Premier League club record alongside Teddy Sheringham, Jürgen Klinsmann and Gareth Bale. At the end of the season, Kane remarked that he had done more in the single campaign than he had expected to do in his whole career.

2015–16: Premier League top goalscorer

On Tottenham's pre-season tour of Australia, Kane attracted numerous fans while visiting the Westfield Sydney shopping centre, resulting in the club sending a minibus to escort him away. On 29 July 2015, Tottenham were the guests in the 2015 MLS All-Star Game at Dick's Sporting Goods Park in Commerce City, Colorado. They lost 2–1 to the MLS All-Stars, with Kane scoring their consolation goal in the 37th minute after beating a challenge from Omar Gonzalez, and he was later substituted in the 77th minute.

Kane's squad number was changed from 18 to 10, previously worn by Emmanuel Adebayor. In an interview with The Daily Telegraph, he said that he changed the number "to become a club legend". With Adebayor and Roberto Soldado having been put up for sale, he began the season as the club's only forward, and the third-choice captain behind Hugo Lloris and Jan Vertonghen. After a 748-minute drought, he scored his first goal of the season on 26 September 2015 as Tottenham came from behind to defeat leaders Manchester City 4–1. Eight days later, he scored an own goal from Jonjo Shelvey's corner kick away to Swansea City, but Tottenham fought back to a 2–2 draw.

On 25 October 2015, Kane scored a hat-trick, including a penalty which he won himself, as Tottenham came from conceding a first-minute goal to triumph 5–1 away to Bournemouth at Dean Court. Eight days later, he recorded his fifth goal of the season with the final goal in a 3–1 win at home to Aston Villa. On 8 November 2015, he gave Tottenham a half-time lead against Arsenal at the Emirates Stadium, albeit in a 1–1 draw; this goal past Petr Čech was from his first touch of Danny Rose's long pass.

Eighteen days after that, he recorded his ninth goal in six matches, the only one of an away match against Qarabağ FK, qualifying Tottenham to the knockout stages of the season's UEFA Europa League. On 19 December 2015, Kane made his 100th appearance for the club in a 2–0 win away to Southampton, and scored his 10th goal in his last 10 matches. A week later, he added two more in a 3–0 win over former loan employers Norwich, putting him on 27 Premier League goals for the year 2015, breaking Sheringham's club record. On 10 January 2016, he scored his 50th goal for Tottenham in a 2–2 draw against Leicester in the third round of the FA Cup.

Kane was Premier League Player of the Month for the third time in March 2016, after scoring five goals in four games, including an angled strike from the corner of the 18-yard box in the North London derby which Kane called "one of my best goals technically". After scoring his 22nd league goal of the season in a 1–1 draw against Liverpool at Anfield on 2 April, Kane became the club's highest goalscorer in a single Premier League season, with six games of the season remaining.

Kane ended the season winning the Premier League Golden Boot, finishing one goal ahead of Sergio Agüero and Jamie Vardy with 25 goals. He was named in the PFA Team of the Year for the second consecutive season, as he helped Tottenham to a third-place finish, and UEFA Champions League qualification.

2016–17: League runner-up and second Golden Boot

In the absence of Hugo Lloris, Kane captained Tottenham in their opening home match of the 2016–17 season, assisting Victor Wanyama's winning goal as Spurs beat Crystal Palace 1–0 in a London derby at White Hart Lane. He opened his scoring account in the fourth matchday of the Premier League season, providing the final goal in a 4–0 win away to Stoke City.

On 14 September 2016, Kane made his UEFA Champions League debut in Spurs' 2–1 loss to Monaco at Wembley Stadium. Four days later, he scored the winning goal against Sunderland in the Premier League, but had to be helped off the field after twisting his right ankle attempting a tackle of Papy Djilobodji. Reports indicated that the ligaments in Kane's ankle were damaged, ruling him out for six-to-eight weeks. After missing five league matches and three in the Champions League group phase, Kane made his return at rivals Arsenal on 6 November, scoring from the penalty spot to equalise in a 1–1 draw. On 22 November, he scored his first Champions League goal in the return fixture against Monaco at the Stade Louis II, a game which saw Spurs eliminated from the competition with a 2–1 loss.

On 1 December 2016, Kane signed a new contract with Tottenham, keeping him at the club until 2022. On 1 January 2017, made his 100th Premier League appearance, scoring the first Premier League goal of the new year against Watford on the 27-minute mark, which he extended to a brace after scoring again in the 33rd minute. In his first match after the birth of his daughter, Kane scored a hat-trick in a 4–0 win against West Brom on 14 January. In the fifth round of the 2016–17 FA Cup on 19 February 2017, Kane scored all three goals as Tottenham beat Fulham 3–0. This meant his fifth career hat-trick, and his second in 2017. On 26 February 2017, Kane once again scored a hat-trick as Tottenham beat Stoke 4–0, his third hat-trick in nine games, and his second in consecutive domestic games. The first of these goals was his 100th in club football. He was named Player of the Month for the fourth time in his career in February 2017.

In March 2017, he injured his ankle in an FA Cup match against former loan club Millwall. On 15 April, Kane scored his 20th Premier League goal of the season against Bournemouth on his first start in a month after returning from injury. This made him the fourth player in Premier League history to achieve 20 goals in three consecutive seasons, after Alan Shearer, Thierry Henry and Ruud van Nistelrooy.

On 20 April, Kane was named in the PFA Team of the Year for the third consecutive season. He was also included in the six player shortlists for the PFA Players' Player of the Year and PFA Young Player of the Year awards. Two days later, he scored in Tottenham's 4–2 FA Cup semi-final loss to rivals Chelsea at Wembley Stadium. In the last match at White Hart Lane on 14 May, Harry Kane scored the 2–0 goal as Tottenham beat Manchester United 2–1. With two games remaining of the season, Kane stood on 22 goals, two fewer than Romelu Lukaku. With a combined seven goals in the last two fixtures however, a 6–1 win over reigning champions Leicester City and a 7–1 win against Hull City, Kane finished as the top scorer of the Premier League on 29 goals, and thus won his second consecutive Golden Boot, becoming only the fifth player to do so.

2017–18: Record breaking year

After not finding the back of the net in Tottenham's first three games, Kane scored a brace in three of his next four appearances for the club across all competitions. His opening goal against Everton on 9 September was his 100th overall for the club, coming in his 169th appearance. On 26 September, Kane scored his first UEFA Champions League hat-trick in a 3–0 group stage win against Cypriot champions APOEL. He was awarded Premier League Player of the Month for the fifth time, and named September 2017 – in which he scored 13 goals in 10 club and international games – as the best month of his career.

On 23 December, Kane equalled Alan Shearer's record of 36 Premier League goals in a calendar year, having scored a hat-trick in a 0–3 away win to Burnley. He surpassed Shearer's record the following game with another hat-trick in the 5–2 home win against Southampton, ending the year with 39 Premier League goals. The hat-trick, his sixth of the year in the Premier League (eighth in all competitions), also made him the first player in Premier League history to score six hat-tricks in a year. With a total of 56 goals scored in all competitions for the year, he also became Europe's top goal scorer of 2017, breaking the seven-year dominance of Lionel Messi and Cristiano Ronaldo as Europe's top goalscorer in a calendar year.

In January 2018, he scored twice in the 4–0 home win against Everton, and became Tottenham's top goalscorer in the Premier League era, breaking Teddy Sheringham's record of 97 Premier League goals for the club. On 4 February, Kane scored an added-time penalty to equalise in a 2–2 draw with Liverpool at Anfield for his 100th Premier League goal; he achieved the century of league goals in 141 games, beaten only by Alan Shearer's 124. He was named in the PFA Team of the Year for the fourth consecutive season in April 2018, alongside fellow forwards Mohamed Salah and Sergio Agüero. On 8 June, Kane signed a new contract to keep him at the club until 2024.

2018–19: UEFA Champions League runner-up
Kane started the season opener against Newcastle United without scoring, before opening his account against Fulham the following weekend. In doing so he ended his hoodoo of failing to score a Premier League goal in the month of August. He also scored for the first time at Old Trafford in the following game as Tottenham won 3–0 in what was only their third away win against Manchester United since 1992, as well as the biggest away win against the club in 46 years. He scored the opening goal against Cardiff City on 1 January 2019, and with that goal, he became the first player to have scored a goal against every Premier League team he has faced. On 13 January 2019, in a match against Manchester United, Kane injured his ankle ligaments late in the game, thereby missing some crucial games including the Champions League last-16 home game.

He returned to the first team squad on 23 February 2019, in a match against Burnley, and was immediately placed in the starting XI. He scored the equalizing goal in the 65th minute to tie the score 1–1, although the match ended a 2–1 defeat. He scored the only goal in the Champions League last-16 away tie against Borussia Dortmund to ensure a 4–0 win on aggregate and progress to the club's second quarter-final in the Champions League. The goal also made him the club's top goalscorer in European competitions with 24 goals scored. During the first leg of the quarter-final in the Champions League on 9 April 2019 against Manchester City, he again suffered an ankle injury, which ended his season domestically in the Premier League. He did, however, return for the Champions League final on 1 June 2019, although his selection after his injury became a subject of debate as Tottenham lost 2–0 to Liverpool.

2019–20: Injury struggles
Kane started Tottenham's first game of the 2019–20 season, scoring twice in a 3–1 home win against Aston Villa. Kane's first goal of the game was his first at the Tottenham Hotspur Stadium. On 1 January 2020, in the away match against Southampton that ended in a 1–0 defeat, Kane suffered a hamstring injury. The damage to his hamstring required an operation which would see him out of action for a few months. Due to the COVID-19 pandemic which resulted in the suspension of League matches, he did not play any further matches until 19 June. On 23 June, in his 200th Premier League appearance for Tottenham, he scored his first goal of 2020 against West Ham, sealing a 2–0 win.

2020–21: Third Golden Boot and Playmaker of the Season
Kane scored his first goal of the season in the Europa League match against Lokomotiv Plovdiv, helping the team to win 2–1 after Plovdiv had two players sent off late in the second half. His first league goal of the 2020–21 season came in the second league match following a spree of four goals which were all scored by Son Heung-min and assisted by Kane, giving Spurs a 5–2 win over Southampton. This is the first time in Premier League history a player has provided four assists to the same teammate in a match and Kane became just the sixth player in Premier League history to assist four goals in a single match, and the first English player to do so.

Kane scored a hat-trick against Maccabi Haifa in the UEFA Europa League play-off round on 1 October, securing qualification for the group stage. On 4 October, he scored a brace in a 6–1 away win against Manchester United, which is the biggest win for Tottenham at Old Trafford and their best result against United since a home win in 1932. He scored his 200th goal for Tottenham in his 300th appearance for the club in the 3–1 win over Ludogorets in the group stage of the Europa League. Kane scored in Tottenham's 2–0 victory over rivals Arsenal making him the record highest goalscorer in the history of the North London Derby with 11 goals. It was also Kane's 100th home goal for Tottenham in all competitions, and his 250th career goal for club and country.

On 2 January 2021, Kane converted a penalty to open the scoring and later provided an assist during Tottenham's 3–0 home victory over Leeds United. This brought both Kane's goal and assist tally in the league to 10, making him the first player in Europe's top five leagues to reach double digits for goals and assists in the 2020–21 season. On 7 March, he scored a brace against Crystal Palace in a 4–1 win; the last goal was assisted by Son Heung-min, and this, their 14th combined goal effort whereby one assisted another, set a record for the most goal combinations in a Premier League season. On 23 May, he scored a goal in a 4–2 win over Leicester City, to reach his 23rd goal of the season and to win the third Golden Boot award in his career. He also won the Premier League Playmaker of the Season award for most assists in a season, becoming the first player to win both the Golden Boot and Playmaker awards in the same season since the introduction of the playmakers' award in 2018.

2021–22: Desire to leave Tottenham
The 2021–22 season was preceded by a dispute over a desire by Kane to leave Tottenham, saying he had a gentlemen's agreement with chairman Daniel Levy that would allow him to leave in the summer. The agreement was not honoured, and Levy rejected the interest expressed by Manchester City for Kane's services, including a £127 million transfer bid. Kane failed to turn up for pre-season training and did not play the first two games of the season. He made his season bow on 22 August as a substitute against Wolverhampton Wanderers – his first appearance since returning late for pre-season. Kane announced his desire to stay at Tottenham on 25 August after the move to Manchester City failed to materialise, with Kane stating: "I will be staying at Tottenham this summer and will be 100 per cent focused on helping the team achieve success." The following day Kane made his first appearance in the UEFA Europa Conference League, against Paços de Ferreira. He scored twice in a 3–0 win to secure the team's progress to the group stage. On 30 September, in the second match of the group stage, he scored a hat-trick in 20 minutes against Mura after coming on as a substitute to win 5–1. This was the first hat-trick ever scored in the Europa Conference League, and made Kane the first player to score a hat-trick in all three current major UEFA club competitions (i.e. Champions League, Europa League, and Europa Conference League).

On 17 October 2021, Kane scored his first Premier League goal of the season in a 3–2 away win against Newcastle United. His second goal of the season came on 19 December, when he scored the opener in a 2–2 home draw against Liverpool. On 19 February 2022, Kane scored twice, including a 95th-minute winner, in a thrilling 3–2 victory over Manchester City. This ended City's 15-game unbeaten streak in the league. On 26 February, Kane scored against Leeds United, and assisted Son; the assist was the 37th time Kane and Son had combined to score, setting a new record of goal-scoring partnerships in the Premier League.

On 16 March, Kane scored in a 2–0 win away at Brighton, bringing his Premier League away goal tally to 95, surpassing Wayne Rooney's record for most Premier League goals scored away from home.

2022–23: All-time Tottenham top goalscorer
Kane scored his first goal of the season in the London derby away at Chelsea. Kane rescued a point for Tottenham by scoring in the sixth minute of injury time to bring the score to 2–2. This took Kane's tally of Premier League goals scored for Tottenham to 184, equalling Sergio Agüero's record of most goals scored for a single Premier League club. Kane broke the record the following game when he scored the only goal in the game against Wolverhampton Wanderers, becoming the first player to score 185 goals in the Premier League for a single club.

On 5 February 2023, Tottenham stated that Kane had become their all-time top scorer, overtaking Jimmy Greaves with his 267th goal for Tottenham and 200th in the Premier League, in a 1–0 home victory against Manchester City. This fact was disputed, however, as Tottenham do not count the two goals Greaves scored in the 1962 FA Charity Shield, which would put him on 268. On 11 March 2023, Kane scored his 269th and 270th goals with a brace in a 3–1 victory against Nottingham Forest giving him the now undisputed record.

International career

2010–2015: Youth level 

In January 2010, Kane was called up to play for the England under-17 team for the Algarve Tournament in Portugal. Kane missed the 2010 UEFA European Under-17 Championship due to illness, with England going on to win the tournament in his absence. He later moved up to the under-19s and scored twice in a 6–1 victory over Albania on 8 October 2010. Kane played a large role in the England under-19s progression to the semi-finals of the 2012 UEFA European Under-19 Championship in Estonia. Kane scored the winner against France in the final group stage match to ensure the team a safe passage through to the semi-finals. In total Kane appeared 14 times for England U19s and contributed 6 goals during that period.

On 28 May 2013, he was named in manager Peter Taylor's 21-man squad for the 2013 FIFA U-20 World Cup. He made his debut on 16 June, in a 3–0 win in a warm-up match against Uruguay. He assisted Luke Williams' goal in the opening group-stage match on 23 June 2013 against Iraq. He then scored in the following match against Chile, collecting a pass after work by Ross Barkley and firing in from the edge of the penalty area. On 13 August 2013, Kane made his debut for the under-21s against Scotland. In that match, he came on as a substitute in the 58th minute, and England won 6–0. On 10 October, he scored a hat-trick for England under-21s against San Marino during 2015 UEFA European Under-21 Championship qualification. He continued to score prolifically, with his brace against France marking 13 goals in 12 matches for the under-21s.

Kane was named in the England under-21 squad for the 2015 UEFA European Under-21 Championship in the Czech Republic, despite opposition from his club manager Mauricio Pochettino. He played every minute of England's campaign at the tournament, which ended with them eliminated in last place in their group.

2015–2018: Senior debut and first major tournaments 

Kane was also eligible for the Republic of Ireland through his father, who was born in Galway, but in August 2014 he ruled out switching allegiance, saying that he wanted to break into the England senior team.

After a good run of form with Tottenham and being the third top goal scorer in the Premier League with 16 goals, on 19 March 2015 Kane was named by manager Roy Hodgson in the England squad to face Lithuania in a UEFA Euro 2016 qualifying match and Italy in a friendly. He made his international debut at Wembley Stadium, replacing Wayne Rooney in the second half against Lithuania, and scored just 80 seconds later with a header from a Raheem Sterling cross. On 30 March 2015, the day before the Italy match, Hodgson announced that Kane would start alongside Rooney, and he played the full 90 minutes of the 1–1 draw at Juventus Stadium.

In his next appearance on 5 September 2015, substitute Kane scored the fifth of England's six goals in a win over San Marino which qualified them for UEFA Euro 2016. Kane scored his third England goal against Switzerland in another qualifier three days later, which they won 2–0. On 12 October 2015, as England finished their qualification campaign with a 10th win from 10 matches, Kane's shot hit the post for an own goal by Lithuanian goalkeeper Giedrius Arlauskis in a 3–0 away victory.

On 22 May 2016, Kane opened the scoring in a 2–1 friendly win over Turkey at the City of Manchester Stadium, but later missed a penalty. He was the first England player to fail to score from the penalty spot during a game since Frank Lampard in 2010, and the first to miss the target since Peter Crouch in 2006. At the European Championship in France that June, Kane was assigned to take corner kicks, a tactic which was criticised by pundits, but defended by Hodgson, who said that Kane was the best for the role.

On 10 June 2017, Kane captained England for the first time in their 2018 FIFA World Cup qualifier with Scotland at Hampden Park, scoring an added-time equaliser to rescue a 2–2 draw. On 5 October, he scored an added-time winner against Slovenia which confirmed England's qualification to the 2018 FIFA World Cup.

2018–2020: Assuming the captaincy and World Cup Golden Boot 
Kane was named in the 23-man England squad for the 2018 FIFA World Cup and was made captain. On 18 June, Kane scored both of England's goals in a 2–1 win over Tunisia, his winning goal coming deep in injury time, in the team's opening group game of the World Cup. In the next group game on 24 June, Kane scored a hat-trick in England's 6–1 win over Panama, which was England's largest ever World Cup victory. With his three goals against Panama, Kane became the third England player to score a hat-trick in a World Cup match, after Geoff Hurst against West Germany in the 1966 final and Gary Lineker against Poland in 1986.

Kane scored his sixth goal of the finals as England overcame Colombia in the Round of 16. Scoring a penalty in a match that finished 1–1 after 120 minutes, also scoring in the penalty shoot-out as England prevailed 4–3; this was the first time that England had managed to win a penalty shoot-out at the World Cup. Kane didn't score again for the rest of the tournament as England finished in fourth place after losing 2–0 Belgium in the third place playoff. However, his six goals in the tournament earned him the Golden Boot as the top goalscorer of the World Cup, the first England player to win the award since Gary Lineker became the first to do so in the 1986 tournament.

The September international break saw the introduction of the UEFA Nations League. England's first match was on 8 September 2018 against Spain, which Kane captained for the full 90 minutes in a game which saw England lose 2–1. On 15 October, England played Spain for the second time in the group, this time running out 3–2 winners with Kane assisting two of the three goals. On 14 November, before a friendly against the United States (US), Kane presented Wayne Rooney with England's Golden Boot in recognition of Rooney's 53 England goals, a record that makes him England's all-time top goal scorer. In an interview following the match, which ended in a 3–0 win for England, Rooney revealed that he wanted Harry Kane to present him the award as he believed that Kane will one day beat it. Three days after the US match, Kane captained England in their final Nations League group match against Croatia as the Three Lions won 2–1. Kane first assisted Jesse Lingard's equaliser then scored the winning goal which saw England top the group and qualify for the finals in June 2019.

2021–2022: Euros runner-up and joint All-time England top scorer 
In the qualifying round of UEFA Euro 2020, Kane captained the 1,000th match played by England, and scored a hat-trick against Montenegro. This brought his tally to 31, which placed him 6th in the all-time list of England's top goalscorers, but also made him the highest-ever scoring England captain. The 7–0 win also secured England's qualification to UEFA Euro 2020. Kane was in fine form throughout the qualifying process, becoming the first Englishman to score in every game in a qualifying campaign, registering a total of twelve goals – the joint-most for an England player in a single year.

In the round of 16 match on 29 June 2021, Kane scored the second goal against Germany. This was his first goal of the tournament. The match resulted in a 2–0 victory for England. He scored a further two goals in the quarter-finals match against Ukraine on 3 July. In the semi-finals against Denmark, Kane scored the winning goal in a 2–1 triumph that secured England's place in the Euro 2020 Final, the country's first final in a major competition since 1966, which they subsequently lost to Italy on penalties after a 1–1 draw in regular time.

In the last two 2022 FIFA World Cup qualifiers against Albania and San Marino, Kane scored back-to-back first-half hat-tricks (including a "perfect hat-trick" against the former and four goals against the latter) to help secure England's qualification to the 2022 FIFA World Cup qualification. In June 2022, in the league phase of the 2022–23 UEFA Nations League, Kane scored his 50th international goal in the game against Germany, making him only the second player to score 50 goals for England, only three goals behind Wayne Rooney in the all-time England top-scorer list. At the 2022 FIFA World Cup, Kane scored twice, enough to equal Rooney's all-time top-scoring record, as England reached the quarter-finals; however they were eliminated by France after he missed a penalty in their 2–1 defeat.

Style of play

Development

Kane's former youth coach Alex Inglethorpe has said of him:When he first came into the under-18s as a 15 year old, he stood out in the sense he looked a bit gangly. He moved slightly awkwardly, he was a bit cumbersome. But look closer, he had a lot of ability, a great technique. I think he surprised people how good he was. Tactically he was very flexible. He often played in midfield. I remember seeing him once playing as a holding midfielder.

While a teenager, Kane initially struggled in Tottenham's academy, as partially due to his date of birth in July, he was not as physically developed as other players, nor was he as quick. However, he gained the respect of coaches with his technique and desire for self-improvement.

When profiling Kane in February 2013, Talksport said that he was best as a second striker, despite also having ability as a centre forward or in a wide position. They wrote that he preferred to place his shots, although he could also score from distance. The report also noted that he had good pace, but was weak in the air and had not scored on his loan at Norwich. Initially a back-up to £26 million Spanish import Roberto Soldado and frequently loaned out, Kane was eventually made Tottenham's starting forward by manager Mauricio Pochettino. Under Pochettino, Kane said that his game has improved through the tough training techniques instituted by the manager. He also strives to achieve marginal gain in order to maximise his potential by tweaking various aspects of his training and preparations as well as nutrition.

Analysis

Former Tottenham manager David Pleat described Kane as an "old-fashioned traditional centre-forward". Clive Allen, who coached him at Tottenham, stated that "one thing I'd say about him, which unfortunately you don't say about a lot of young footballers, is that he had a passion for the game. He loves football, he loves playing, he loves scoring goals". His former Tottenham under-21 coach Les Ferdinand likened Kane's movement to their former forward Teddy Sheringham, and the power and accuracy of his shots to Alan Shearer.

A tall and physical striker, Kane's style of play has been compared to that of former Tottenham forward Jürgen Klinsmann, a comparison Kane called flattering in February 2015. In March 2015, Football Association chairman Greg Dyke named Kane as the benchmark for clubs producing young English players. Shearer said that month that the three best strikers playing in the league were Kane, Diego Costa and Sergio Agüero. Although he was initially criticised for his limited aerial game in his early career, as well as his lack of significant pace, he became more prolific with his head as his career progressed.

After Tottenham's victory over Chelsea in January 2015, blogger Chris Miller wrote, "Nobody thought he was the guy who was going to give that performance against Chelsea". In February 2015, BBC Sport wrote that Kane was best as a lone striker, with his "hold-up play and close control" making him apt in other positions as well. Also that month, Match of the Day pundit Danny Murphy said that the England team should be built around Kane, stating, "I'm struggling to see a weakness in the lad's game". ESPN reporter Michael Cox stated that "Kane was initially considered a pure goal scorer, he's actually a good all-round player, often playing as an attacking midfielder", pointing out that during the 2018 FIFA World Cup "Kane's contributions in deeper positions were outstanding, his back-to-goal work as impressive as ever". Indeed, although Kane is predominantly known for his clinical finishing and prolific goalscoring ability as an out-and-out striker, he is also known for his vision, technique, link-up play, and passing ability, which enables him to drop deep, bring his teammates into play, and create chances for other players; he is therefore also capable of playing in a more creative role as a false 9 or even as a number 10. As such, in 2022, Sam McGuire of Opta Sports identified him as "the most creative number 9 in the world." Additionally, he is also known for his defensive work-rate, and is an accurate penalty taker.

Beginning in 2020, Kane started to be criticised about a perceived tactic of backing into defenders jumping for headers, causing the players to fall backwards onto the pitch, potentially risking serious injury. After doing so to Brighton & Hove Albion player Adam Lallana and winning a penalty, Kane was criticised by ex-Arsenal player Martin Keown who said, "He looks at his opponent, knows what he is going to do and makes a back for him. I think it is dangerous play from Harry Kane and he knows what he is doing and I don't even think it is a penalty." However, this tactic has been defended by Crystal Palace defender Gary Cahill who said, "I think that's just part of football. I think an element of that is being clever and experienced and knowing when you can maybe draw a foul in."

Media and sponsorship
Kane has a sponsorship deal with sportswear and equipment supplier Nike: he wears Nike Hypervenom football boots. Following his 100th Premier League goal in February 2018 Nike launched the special-edition Hypervenom 3 HK. In 2018 he featured in a Nike commercial, 'Nothing Beats A Londoner', along with other sports stars based in the city, including quadruple Olympic champion Mo Farah and Chelsea playmaker Eden Hazard, highlighting London's diversity. Ahead of UEFA Euro 2016, Kane featured in advertisements for Mars Bars and Beats by Dr. Dre headphones, the latter alongside Antoine Griezmann, Mario Götze and Cesc Fàbregas.

Kane features in EA Sports' FIFA video game series: he was named in the Team of the Year in FIFA 18, joining Lionel Messi and Cristiano Ronaldo in attack. Kane and Camila Cabello announced the winner of the "Best International Male Solo Artist" award at the 2018 Brit Awards at the O2 Arena on 21 February, namely Kendrick Lamar.

On 14 May 2020, Kane announced that he would sponsor Leyton Orient's shirts for the next season to help support the first club he played for professionally through the COVID-19 pandemic. The unusual sponsorship deal, the first of its kind in English football, has the approval of Premier League, English Football League and Football Association, and the sponsorship has been donated to charities which will receive 10% of the proceeds of the respective shirt sales – the home shirt shows a thank you message to the NHS frontline workers tackling the pandemic, the away shirt sporting a logo of Haven House Children's Hospice while the third kit features the mental health charity Mind.

Personal life
In an interview given in February 2015, Kane said that he was in a relationship with Katie Goodland, whom he has known since childhood. He told Esquire, "We went to school together, so she's seen my whole career. Of course, she's finding it a little crazy. I think she's even been in the papers a couple of times taking the dogs out." On 1 July 2017, Kane announced his engagement to Goodland on his Twitter account, and said in June 2019 that they had married.

Kane and Goodland announced the birth of their first child, Ivy Jane Kane, on 8 January 2017. The birth of their second daughter, Vivienne Jane Kane, was announced on 8 August 2018. Their first son, Louis Harry Kane, was born on 29 December 2020.

Kane and Goodland have two Labrador retrievers, Brady and Wilson, named after NFL quarterbacks Tom Brady and Russell Wilson. Kane has cited The Brady 6, a documentary about Brady, as an inspiration for his development. In 2019, Kane expressed an interest in becoming a kicker in the NFL "in 10 to 12 years".

Kane abstains from alcohol during the football season, and starting from 2017, he hired a full-time chef to optimise his nutrition. He plays golf in his free time.

Kane was appointed a Member of the Order of the British Empire (MBE) in the 2019 New Year Honours for services to football.

On 10 October 2022, Kane launched the Harry Kane Foundation, which 'seeks to change perceptions of mental health by normalising conversations and promoting positive habits to end stigma around the subject'. To mark the occasion, Kane featured on CBeebies' Bedtimes Stories.

Career statistics

Club

International

England score listed first, score column indicates score after each Kane goal

Honours
Tottenham Hotspur
Football League/EFL Cup runner-up: 2014–15, 2020–21
UEFA Champions League runner-up: 2018–19

England
UEFA European Championship runner-up: 2020
UEFA Nations League third place: 2018–19

Individual
Millwall Young Player of the Year: 2011–12
Premier League Player of the Month: January 2015, February 2015, March 2016, February 2017, September 2017, December 2017, March 2022
PFA Premier League Team of the Year: 2014–15, 2015–16, 2016–17, 2017–18, 2020–21
PFA Young Player of the Year: 2014–15
Tottenham Hotspur Player of the Year: 2014–15, 2020–21
Premier League Golden Boot: 2015–16, 2016–17, 2020–21
Premier League Playmaker of the Season: 2020–21
PFA Fans' Player of the Year: 2016–17
Football Supporters' Federation Player of the Year: 2017
England Player of the Year Award: 2017, 2018
FIFA World Cup Golden Boot: 2018
FIFA World Cup Dream Team: 2018
IFFHS World's Best Top Goal Scorer: 2017
London Football Awards Premier League Player of the Year: 2018, 2021

Orders
Member of the Order of the British Empire: 2019

See also 

 List of men's footballers with 50 or more international goals
 List of footballers with 100 or more Premier League goals

References

External links

Profile at the Tottenham Hotspur F.C. website
Profile at the Football Association website

1993 births
Living people
Footballers from Chingford
Footballers from Walthamstow
English footballers
Association football forwards
Tottenham Hotspur F.C. players
Leyton Orient F.C. players
Millwall F.C. players
Norwich City F.C. players
Leicester City F.C. players
English Football League players
Premier League players
First Division/Premier League top scorers
England youth international footballers
England under-21 international footballers
England international footballers
UEFA Euro 2016 players
2018 FIFA World Cup players
UEFA Euro 2020 players
2022 FIFA World Cup players
Outfield association footballers who played in goal
Members of the Order of the British Empire
English people of Irish descent